Metalul Reșița can refer to:

 CS Muncitorul Reșița, shortened CS Muncitorul Reșița, a Romanian football club founded in 1911
 CSM Reșița, named Metalul Reșița during 1949–1956, a Romanian football club founded in 1926
 Sportul Snagov, named Metalul Reșița during 2013–2017, a Romanian football club founded in 2010